Panic in the Streets is a 1950 American film noir directed by Elia Kazan. It was shot exclusively on location in New Orleans, Louisiana, and features numerous New Orleans citizens in speaking and non-speaking roles.

The film tells the story of Lieutenant Commander Clinton Reed, an officer of the U.S. Public Health Service (played by Richard Widmark) and a police captain (Paul Douglas) who have only a day or two in which to prevent an epidemic of pneumonic plague after Reed determines a waterfront homicide victim is an index case. Co-stars include Barbara Bel Geddes (as Reed's wife Nancy), Jack Palance (in his film debut) and Zero Mostel – the latter two play associates of the victim who had prompted the investigation. The film was also the debut of Tommy Rettig, who played the Reeds' son.

The film was released on DVD by 20th Century Fox as part of the Fox Film Noir collection, along with Laura and Call Northside 777, on March 15, 2005.

The score was composed by Alfred Newman.

The film was originally named Port of Entry, subsequently Outbreak, and ultimately Panic in the Streets.

Plot
After brawling over a card game in the wharf area of New Orleans, a man named Kochak, suffering visibly from a flu-like illness, is killed by gangster Blackie and his two flunkies, Kochak's cousin Poldi and a man named Fitch. They leave the body on the docks, and later when the dead man, who carries no identification, is brought to the morgue, the coroner grows suspicious about the bacteria present in his blood and calls Lieutenant Commander Clinton Reed, a doctor and commissioned corps officer of the U.S. Public Health Service. Reed is enjoying a rare day off with his wife Nancy and their son Tommy, but decides to inspect the body.

After careful examination, he determines that Kochak had "pneumonic plague," the pulmonary version of bubonic plague. Reed springs into action, insisting that everyone who came into contact with the body be inoculated. He also orders that the dead man's identity be determined, as well as his comings and goings during the previous few days. Reed meets with people from the mayor's office, the police commissioner and other city officials, but they are skeptical of his claims. Eventually, however, his impassioned pleas convince them that they have forty-eight hours to save New Orleans from the plague. Reed must also convince police captain Tom Warren and the others that the press must not be notified, because report of a plague would spread mass panic.

Warren and his men begin to interview Slavic immigrants, as it has been determined that the body may be of Armenian, Czech or mixed blood. Burdened by the knowledge that the massive investigation has little chance of success, Reed accuses Warren of not taking the threat seriously enough. In turn, Warren admits that he thinks Reed is ambitious and trying to use the situation to further his career. Reed, angry, decides to take matters into his own hands and, acting on a hunch that the man may have entered the city's port illegally, goes to the National Maritime Union hiring hall and passes out copies of the dead man's picture. Although the workers tell Reed that seamen never talk, he goes to a café next door hoping that someone will meet him with a tip. Eventually a young woman shows up and takes Reed to see her friend Charlie, who reluctantly admits that he worked aboard the ship, the Nile Queen, upon which the already ill man was smuggled.

Meanwhile, Fitch, who was questioned by Warren but claimed to know nothing, goes to Blackie and warns him about the investigation. Blackie plans to get out of town, but begins to suspect that his sidekick Poldi received expensive smuggled goods from Kochak, explaining the police's intense investigation of the man's murder. Reed and Warren, who is now convinced of Reed's integrity, go to the Nile Queen and convince the crew to talk by telling them that they will die if the sick man was indeed on their ship. After carrying up a sick cook from the hold, the seamen then permit Reed and Warren to inoculate and question them, revealing in the process that Kochak boarded at Oran and was fond of shish kebab. With this lead, Reed and Warren canvas the city's Greek restaurants, and just after they leave one such establishment, Blackie arrives to meet Poldi, who is very ill. A short time later, Reed receives word that a woman, Rita, has died of the fever and realizes that she was the wife of the Greek restaurant proprietor John Mefaris who had earlier lied about having served Kochak.

Reed returns to headquarters to discover that a reporter is threatening to break the story that a pathogenic bacteria is endangering the city. Reed is impressed when the deeply committed yet unorthodox Warren throws the reporter into jail to keep him quiet. Late in the evening, a beleaguered Reed returns home for a cup of coffee and his wife announces that she is pregnant. She then tries to restore her husband's flagging self-confidence. A few hours later, Reed and Warren learn that the mayor is angry about their treatment of the reporter. The reporter, who has been released, announces that the story will appear in the morning paper in four hours, giving Reed and Warren little time to find their man. Meanwhile, Blackie goes to Poldi's room and tries to force him to reveal information about some smuggled goods, but the dying Poldi is delirious and only rants nonsensically. Blackie then brings in his own doctor and tells Poldi's grandmother that they will take care of him. Just then, Reed, having been tipped off by the nurse looking after Poldi, arrives, and Blackie and Fitch, who are carrying Poldi down the stairs, pitch the man over the side and flee. Reed chases the two to the docks, where he tries to explain to them about the plague. The men run desperately through depots, docks and a warehouse, and at one point, Warren shoots and injures Blackie, preventing him from shooting Reed. Blackie accidentally shoots Fitch and then tries to struggle onto a ship but, exhausted, he is unable to pass a rat guard on the mooring line, and falls into the water. His work finally done, Reed heads for home, and on the way, Warren offers to give him some of the smuggled perfume that Poldi had indeed received from Kochak. As the radio announces the resolution of the crisis, a proud Nancy greets her husband.

Cast
 Richard Widmark as Lieutenant Commander "Clint" Reed, M.D.
 Paul Douglas as Police Captain Tom Warren
 Barbara Bel Geddes as Nancy Reed
 Jack Palance (as "Walter Jack Palance") as Blackie
 Zero Mostel as Raymond Fitch
 Alexis Minotis as John Mefaris, Greek restaurant owner
 Dan Riss as Neff, newspaper reporter
 Guy Thonajan as Poldi, Blackie's henchman 
 Tommy Rettig as Tommy Reed
 Tommy Cook as Vince Poldi, younger brother
 Pat Walshe as himself (uncredited)

Pre-production 
The production of Panic in the Streets underwent several rounds of edits with the effort to abide by the Motion Picture Production Code (Hays Code). Originally titled Port of Entry, the temporary script of the film was sent on November 11, 1949 to Joseph Breen, the film censor with the Motion Picture Producers and Distributors of America who applied the Production Code to film production. Joseph Breen himself indicated in threads of letters with Colonel Jason S. Joy, the Director of Public Relations of the 20th Century Fox, the changes needed for the script. Suggestions such as "Violet must not be suggestive of a prostitute", "We assume there will be no suggestion that the police officer is killed", and "The scene of Martinez and the mattress falling should not be too realistically gruesome," were made. On December 20, 1949, in the Joy's letter responding to the suggestion of Breen, the film had been renamed Outbreak. The sensitive content of the film, especially the scenes pointed out by Breen, were not fully changed until after a couple back and forth of letters that lasted for around 3 months. Ultimately, the film was named Panic in the Streets in the final version of the synopsis on March 8, 1950. Approved by the Production Code Administration (PCA) on March 14, 1950, the film officially entered the production stage.

Reception

Box office
The film failed to recover its costs at the box office which Darryl Zanuck blamed in part on location shooting. He felt if the film had been made for $850,000 it would have been profitable.

Critical response
The New York Times gave the film a mixed review and wrote, "Although it is excitingly presented, Panic in the Streets misses the mark as superior melodrama because it is not without obvious, sometimes annoying exaggeration that demands more indulgence than some spectators may be willing to contribute. However, there is an electric quality to the climax staged in a warehouse on the New Orleans waterfront that should compensate for minor annoyances which come to the surface spasmodically in Panic in the Streets."

Variety magazine liked the film and wrote, "This is an above-average chase meller. Tightly scripted and directed, it concerns the successful attempts to capture a couple of criminals, who are germ carriers, in order to prevent a plague and panic in a large city. The plague angle is somewhat incidental to the cops-and-bandits theme...There is vivid action, nice human touches and some bizarre moments. Jack Palance gives a sharp performance."

New Orleans film critic David Lee Simmons wrote in 2005, "The film noir elements come from the movie's use of post-war German Expressionist and Italian Neo-Realist techniques. Kazan admired how the Expressionists used chiaroscuro lighting to heighten emotion, and he related to the Neo-Realists' cinéma vérité portrayals of those living on the margin of society. Panic offered him a chance to explore these styles further by experimenting with cinematography and casting real people. After working with some of the biggest stars in Hollywood – Dorothy McGuire, Spencer Tracy, Katharine Hepburn, Dana Andrews, Gregory Peck and Ethel Barrymore – Kazan wanted to go in the opposite direction. To suit the needs of this picture and his new approach, he recruited not only lesser stars, but also some of his rougher cronies from the New York stage scene, and on top of that several New Orleanians with varied levels of acting experience."

Review aggregation website Rotten Tomatoes retrospectively collected 24 reviews and gave the film a score of 96%, with an average rating of 7.46 out of 10.

Awards
Wins
 Venice Film Festival: International Award, Elia Kazan; 1950.
 Academy Awards: Oscar, Best Writing, Motion Picture Story, Edna Anhalt and Edward Anhalt; 1951.

Nominations
 Venice Film Festival: Golden Lion, Elia Kazan; 1950.
 Writers Guild of America: WGA Award, Best Written American Drama, Richard Murphy; The Robert Meltzer Award (Screenplay Dealing Most Ably with Problems of the American Scene), Richard Murphy; 1951.

References

External links

 
 
 
 
 
 

1950 films
1950s psychological thriller films
20th Century Fox films
American psychological thriller films
American black-and-white films
American chase films
1950s English-language films
Films about infectious diseases
Films based on short fiction
Films directed by Elia Kazan
Films set in New Orleans
Films shot in New Orleans
Films that won the Academy Award for Best Story
Films scored by Alfred Newman
Plague (disease)
Films produced by Sol C. Siegel
Film noir
Films with screenplays by Edward Anhalt
Films with screenplays by Edna Anhalt
1950s American films